This is the complete order of battle of 
the French and Third Coalition armies during the Battle of Austerlitz.

La Grande Armée 

The French army was under the supreme command of Emperor Napoleon, with Marshal Louis Alexandre Berthier as his chief of staff. General of division Nicolas-Marie Songis des Courbons commanded the artillery. The overall strength of the French army during the battle is estimated to have been about 73,000 men of all arms and 139 artillery pieces. This number also includes three battalions of men which made up the Army's train d'artillerie.

Garde Impériale (French Imperial Guard) 
Strength: 5,500 men and 24 guns. Marshal Jean-Baptiste Bessières.
Infantry of the Guard
1er and 2e Battaillons Grenadiers à Pied (foot grenadiers)
1er and 2e Battaillons Chasseurs à Pied (light infantry)
The Grenadiers of the Italian Royal Guard
Cavalry of the Guard
Grenadiers à Cheval (horse grenadiers)
Chasseurs à Cheval (light cavalry)
Les Mamelukes
Gendarmerie d'Elite
Artillery of the Guard
Light Artillery of the Guard
Artillery Train of the Guard

I Corps 
Strength: 13,000 men and 24 guns. Marshal Jean Baptiste Bernadotte.
Advanced Guard
27ème Régiment d'lnfanterie Légère (light infantry)
1st Division – General of Division Olivier Rivaud de la Raffinière
Brigadiers: Bernard Georges François Frère, François Werlé
8ème Régiment d'lnfanterie de Ligne (line infantry)
45ème Régiment d'lnfanterie de Ligne
54ème Régiment d'lnfanterie de Ligne
2nd Division – General of Division Jean-Baptiste Drouet
Brigadiers: Pierre Charles Dumoulin, Michel-Marie Pacthod
94ème Régiment d'lnfanterie de Ligne
95ème Régiment d'lnfanterie de Ligne
Light Cavalry Division – General of Division François Etienne de Kellermann
1st Brigade – General of Brigade Frédéric Marisy
2ème Régiment de Hussards (hussars)
5ème Régiment de Hussards
2nd Brigade – General of Brigade Joseph Denis Picard
4ème Régiment de Hussards
5ème Régiment de Chasseurs à Cheval

III Corps 
Strength: 4,300 men (including 830 cavalry) and 12 guns. Marshal Louis Nicolas Davout.
2nd Division – General of Division Louis Friant
1st Brigade – General of Brigade Georges Kister
15ème Régiment d'lnfanterie Légère
33ème Régiment d'lnfanterie de Ligne
2nd Brigade – General of Brigade Pierre-Charles Lochet
48ème Régiment d'lnfanterie de Ligne
111ème Régiment d'lnfanterie de Ligne
3rd Brigade – General of Brigade Étienne Heudelet de Bierre
108ème Régiment d'lnfanterie de Ligne
1st Regiment des Dragons (attached from Klein's 1st Dragoon Div.)
4th Dragoon Division – General François Antoine Louis Bourcier
1st Brigade – General of Brigade Louis Michel Antoine Sahuc
15ème Régiment des Dragons (dragoons)
17ème Régiment des Dragons
2nd Brigade – General of Brigade Claude Joseph de Laplanche-Morthières
18ème Régiment des Dragons
19ème Régiment des Dragons
3rd Brigade – General of Brigade Jean Christophe Collin
25ème Régiment des Dragons
27ème Régiment des Dragons
Corps Artillery (8x 8-pdr & 4x 6" howitzer)

IV Corps 
Strength: 23,600 men and 35 guns. Marshal Nicolas Jean de Dieu Soult
1st Division – General of Division Louis Vincent Le Blond de Saint-Hilaire
1st Brigade – General of Brigade Charles Antoine Morand
10ème Régiment d'lnfanterie Légère
2nd Brigade – General of Brigade Paul Thiébault
14ème Régiment d'lnfanterie de Ligne
36ème Régiment d'lnfanterie de Ligne
3rd Brigade – General of Brigade Louis-Prix Varé
43ème Régiment d'lnfanterie de Ligne (attached to Vandamme's Div. during battle)
55ème Régiment d'lnfanterie de Ligne (attached to Vandamme's Div. during battle)
2nd Division – General of Division Dominique Joseph Rene Vandamme
1st Brigade – General of Brigade Joseph François Ignace Maximilien Schiner
24ème Régiment d'lnfanterie Légère
2nd Brigade – General of Brigade Claude François Ferey
4ème Régiment d'lnfanterie de Ligne
28ème Régiment d'lnfanterie de Ligne
3rd Brigade – General of Brigade Jacques Lazare Savettier de Candras
46ème Régiment d'lnfanterie de Ligne
57ème Régiment d'lnfanterie de Ligne
3rd Division – General of Division Claude Juste Alexandre Legrand
1st Brigade – General of Brigade Pierre Hugues Victoire Merle
26ème Régiment d'lnfanterie Légère
Tirailleurs du Pô (Italian light infantry) 
Tirailleurs Corses (Corsican light infantry)
2nd Brigade – General of Brigade Jean-Baptiste Michel Féry
3ème Régiment d'lnfanterie de Ligne
3rd Brigade – General of Brigade Victor Levasseur
18ème Régiment d'lnfanterie de Ligne
75ème Régiment d'lnfanterie de Ligne
Light Cavalry Division – General of Brigade Pierre Margaron
8ème Régiment de Hussards (Hussars)
11ème Régiment de Chasseurs à Cheval
26ème Régiment de Chasseurs à Cheval
Corps Artillery – 35 guns (mostly 12-pdrs)

V Corps 
Strength: 12,700 men and 20 guns. Marshal Jean Lannes
1st Division – General of Division Marie-François Auguste de Caffarelli du Falga  (attached from 3rd Corps)
1st Brigade – General of Brigade Georges-Henri Eppler
13ème Régiment d'Infanterie Légère
2nd Brigade – General of Brigade Joseph Laurent Demont
17ème Régiment d'Infanterie de Ligne
30ème Régiment d'Infanterie de Ligne
3rd Brigade – General of Brigade Jean Louis Debilly
51ème Régiment d'Infanterie de Ligne
61ème Régiment d'Infanterie de Ligne
3rd Division – General of Division Louis Gabriel Suchet
1st Brigade – General of Brigade Michel Claparède
17ème Régiment d'Infanterie Légère
2nd Brigade – General of Brigade Nicolas Léonard Beker
34ème Régiment d'Infanterie de Ligne
40ème Régiment d'Infanterie de Ligne
3rd Brigade – General of Brigade Jean-Marie Valhubert
64ème Régiment d'Infanterie de Ligne
88ème Régiment d'Infanterie de Ligne
Light Cavalry Division – General of Brigade Anne-François-Charles Trelliard
1st Brigade – General of Brigade Anne-François-Charles Trelliard
9ème Régiment de Hussards
10ème Régiment de Hussards
2nd Brigade – General of Brigade Jean-Louis-François Fauconnet
13ème Chasseurs à Cheval
21ème Chasseurs à Cheval
Corps Artillery 20 guns (mostly 12-pdrs)

Grenadier Division 
Strength: 5,700 men. General of Division Nicolas Oudinot (present, but convalescent) – effective command given to Grand Marshal of the Palace General of Division Géraud Duroc.

This famous, albeit provisional, formation was composed of elite companies from several regiments that were on garrison duty.

Carabinier companies (equivalent to grenadiers in light infantry formations) from:
2ème, 3ème, 15ème, 28ème and Peale Régiments d'Infanterie Légère
Grenadier companies from: 9éme, 13ème, 58ème and 81ème Régiments d'lnfanterie de Ligne

Cavalry Reserve 
Strength: 7,400 sabres and 36 guns. Marshal Prince Joachim Murat
1st Heavy Cavalry Division – General of Division Étienne Marie Antoine Champion de Nansouty
1st Brigade – General of Brigade Joseph Piston
1er Régiment de Carabiniers à Cheval (205 in 3 sqns) – Colonel Cochois
2ème Régiment de Carabiniers à Cheval (181 in 3 sqns) – Colonel Morin
2nd Brigade – General of Brigade Armand Lebrun de La Houssaye
2ème Régiment de Cuirassiers (304 in 3 sqns) – Colonel Yvendorff
9ème Régiment de Cuirassiers (280 in 3 sqns) – Colonel Doumerc
3rd Brigade – General of Brigade Antoine Louis Decrest de Saint-Germain
3ème Régiment de Cuirassiers (333 in 3 sqns) – Colonel Preval
12ème Régiment de Cuirassiers (277 in 3 sqns) – Colonel Belfort
Artillery: 4th Company, 2nd Artillery Regiment, 92 men.
2nd Heavy Cavalry Division – General of Division Jean-Joseph Ange d'Hautpoul
1st Brigade – Colonel Jean-Baptiste Noirot
1er Régiment de Cuirassiers (388 in 3 sqns) – Colonel Guiton
5ème Régiment de Cuirassiers (375 in 3 sqns) – Colonel Noireau
2nd Brigade – General of Brigade Raymond-Gaspard de Bonardi de Saint-Sulpice
10ème Régiment de Cuirassiers (254 in 3 sqns) – Colonel Lataye
11ème Régiment de Cuirassiers (327 in 3 sqns) – Colonel Fouler
Artillery: 4th Company, 2nd Artillery Regiment, 42 men
2nd Dragoon Division – General of Division Frédéric Henri Walther
1st Brigade – General of Brigade Horace Sébastiani
3ème Régiment de Dragons
6ème Régiment de Dragons
2nd Brigade – General of Brigade Dominique Mansuy Roget
10ème Régiment de Dragons
11ème Régiment de Dragons
3rd Brigade – General of Brigade André Joseph Boussart
13ème Régiment de Dragons
22ème Régiment de Dragons
3rd Dragoon Division – General of Division Marc Antoine de Beaumont
1st Brigade – General of Brigade Charles Joseph Boyé
5ème Régiment de Dragons
8ème Régiment de Dragons
2nd Brigade – General of Brigade Nicolas Joseph Scalfort
12ème Régiment de Dragons
16ème Régiment de Dragons
21ème Régiment de Dragons
Light Cavalry Division – General of Division François Etienne de Kellermann
 Detached from I Corps
Light Cavalry Brigade – General of Brigade Édouard Jean Baptiste Milhaud
16ème Régiment de Chasseurs à Cheval
22ème Régiment de Chasseurs à Cheval
Attached artillery – 36 guns in companies of artillerie à cheval (Horse-Artillery)

Army of the Third Coalition 

Opposing the French at Austerlitz were the combined imperial armies of Russia and Austria, under the nominal command of Tsar Alexander I and Emperor Francis II, respectively. However, overall field command was taken by the Russian General Mikhail Illarionovich Golenischev-Kutuzov. The Austrian forces were led by Lieutenant General Prince Johann von Liechtenstein. Total strength during the battle is approximately 85,400 men and 278 guns of all types.

The Russian Imperial Guard 
Strength: 6,730 infantry, 3,700 horsemen, 100 Pioneers and 40 guns. Grand Duke Constantine
Infantry of the Guard – Lieutenant-General Maliutin
Infantry Brigade – Major-General I. Depreradovich
Preobrazhensky Regiment of Life Guards
Semenovsky Regiment of Life Guards
Izmaylovsky Regiment of Life Guards
Guard Jaeger Battalion
Leib-Grenadier Regiment – Major-General Lobanov
Guard Artillery Battery Nr. 1 (10x 12-pdr)
2 Artillery Batteries (each 10x 6-pdr)
Pioneers of the Guard (1 company)
Cavalry of the Guard – Lieutenant-General Kologrivov
Cavalry Brigade – Major-General Jankovich
Chevalier Guard Regiment (5 sqns)
Lifeguard Horse Regiment (5 sqns)
Cavalry Brigade – Major-General N. Depreradovich
Lifeguard Hussar Regiment (5 sqns)
Lifeguard Cossack Regiment
Guard Horse-Artillery Battery Nr. 1 (10x 6-pdr)

Advanced Guard of the Tsar's Army 
Strength: 9,200 infantry, 4,500 horsemen and 42 guns. Lieutenant-General Peter I. Bagration
Infantry
Infantry Brigade – Major-General Dolgorukov
5th Jaeger Regiment – Major Pantenius
6th Jaeger Regiment – Colonel Belokopytov
Infantry Brigade – Major-General Kamensky
Arkhangelgorod Regiment – Colonel Berlizeev
Infantry Brigade – Major-General Engelhardt
Old Ingermanland Infantry Regiment
Pskov Infantry Regiment
2 Artillery Batteries (each 10 guns)
Cavalry
Cavalry Brigade – Major-General Ludwig von Wittgenstein
Pavlograd Hussar Regiment
Mariupol Hussar Regiment
Cavalry Brigade – Major-General Voropaitzky
The Empress Cuirassier Regiment (5 sqns) – Colonel Count de Witt
Tver Dragoon Regiment (5 sqns)
St. Petersburg Dragoon Regiment (5 sqns)
Cossack Brigade – Major-General Tschaplitz
Kiselev Cossack Regiment
Malakhov Cossack Regiment
Khanzhenkov Cossack Regiment
Horse-Artillery Battery Nr. 1 (12x 6-pdr)
Horse-Artillery Battery Nr. 4 (6x 6-pdr)
(Austrian) Horse-Artillery Battery Nr. 5 (6x 6-pdr)

Advance Guard of General Friedrich Wilhelm von Buxhoeveden 
Strength: 3,440 infantry, 3,440 horsemen and 12 light guns. Feldmarschall-Leutnant Michael von Kienmayer
1st Infantry Brigade – General-Major Georg Symon de Carneville
Brooder Grenz Infantry Regiment Nr. 7 (500 in 1 battalion)
1st Szekler Grenz Infantry Regiment Nr. 14 (1,300 in 2 battalions)
2nd Szekler Grenz Infantry Regiment Nr. 15 (1,300 in 2 battalions)
Pioneers (340 in 3 companies)
1st Cavalry Brigade – General-Major Karl Wilhelm von Stutterheim
O'Reilly Chevau-léger Regiment Nr. 3 (900 in 8 squadrons)
Merveldt Uhlan Regiment Nr. 1 (40 in 1 troop)
2nd Cavalry Brigade – General-Major Johann Nepomuk von Nostitz-Rieneck
Schwarzenberg Uhlan Regiment Nr. 2 (100 in one-half squadron)
Hessen-Homburg Hussar Regiment Nr. 4 (600 in 6 squadrons) – Colonel Freiherr von Mohr
3rd Cavalry Brigade – General-Major Moritz von Liechtenstein
Szekler Hussar Regiment Nr. 11 (800 in 8 squadrons) – Colonel Gabriel Geringer von Odenburg
Sysoev Cossack Regiment
Melentev Cossack Regiment
Horse-Artillery Battery Nr. 1 (6x 6-pdr)
Horse-Artillery Battery Nr. 2 (6x 6-pdr)

First column 
Strength: 13,240 infantry, 250 cavalry, 40 light and 24 heavy guns. Lieutenant-General Dmitry Dokhturov
1st Infantry Brigade – Major-General Friedrich von Löwis of Menar
7th Jäger Regiment (1 battalion) – Colonel Pavel P. Tolbukhin
New Ingermanland Infantry Regiment (3 battalions)
Yaroslav Infantry Regiment (2 battalions)
2nd Infantry Brigade –  Major-General Urusov
Vladimir Infantry Regiment
Bryansk Infantry Regiment – Lieutenant-Colonel Nikolai K. Rubanov
Vyatka Infantry Regiment
Moscow Infantry Regiment
Kiev Grenadier Regiment
Pioneers (1 company)
Denisov Cossack Regiment
(Russian) Heavy Battery Nr. 1 (12x 12-pdr)
(Russian) Heavy Battery Nr. 2 (12x 12-pdr)
4 Artillery Batteries (each 10 guns)

Second column 
Strength: 11,250 infantry, 300 horsemen, and 30 light guns. Lieutenant-General Louis Alexandre Andrault de Langeron
1st Infantry Brigade – Major-General Zakhar Dmitrievich Olsufiev
Viborg Infantry Regiment
Perm Infantry Regiment
Kursk Infantry Regiment
2nd Infantry Brigade – Major-General Sergei Mikhailovich Kamensky
Ryazhsk Infantry Regiment
Fanagoria Grenadier Regiment
Pioneers (1 company)
St. Petersburg Dragoon Regiment
Isayev Cossack Regiment
3 Artillery Batteries (each 10 guns)

Third column 
Strength: 7,700 infantry and 30 light guns. Lieutenant General I. Przebyszewski
1st Infantry Brigade – Major-General Ivan I. Muller (or Miller)
7th Jaeger Regiment (2 battalions)
8th Jaeger Regiment
Galicia Infantry Regiment
2nd Infantry Brigade – Major-General Selekhov
Butyrsk Infantry Regiment – Lieutenant-Colonel Treskin M. L`vov
Podolia Infantry Regiment
Narva Infantry Regiment
Pioneers (1 company)
3 Artillery Batteries (each 10 guns)

Fourth column 
Strength: 13,900 infantry, 52 light and 24 heavy guns. Lieutenant-General Mikhail Miloradovich and Feldmarschall-Leutnant Johann Kollowrat
Advanced Guard – Lieutenant-Colonel Monakhtin
Novgorod Infantry Regiment (1 battalion)
Apsheron Infantry Regiment (1 battalion)
Archduke John Dragoon Regiment Nr. 1 (2 sqns)
1st Infantry Brigade – Major-General Wodniansky
Novgorod Infantry Regiment (2 battalions)
Apsheron Infantry Regiment (2 battalions)
Little Russia Grenadier Regiment
Smolensk Infantry Regiment (2 battalions)
2nd Infantry Brigade – General-Major Heinrich von Rottermund
Kaunitz Infantry Regiment Nr. 20 (900 in 1 battalion)
Salzburg Infantry Regiment Nr. 23 (3,000 in 6 battalions)
Auersperg Infantry Regiment Nr. 24 (600 in 1 battalion)
3rd Infantry Brigade – General-Major Franz von Jurczek (or  Jirčik)
Kaiser Infantry Regiment Nr. 1 (1,000 in 1 battalion)
Czartoryski Infantry Regiment Nr. 9 (600 in 1 battalion)
Lindenau Infantry Regiment Nr. 29 (400 in 1 battalion)
Württemberg Infantry Regiment Nr. 38 (500 in 1 battalion)
Kerpen Infantry Regiment Nr. 49 (700 in 1 battalion)
Reuss-Greitz Infantry Regiment Nr. 55 (600 in 1 battalion)
Beaulieu Infantry Regiment Nr. 58 (500 in 1 battalion)
Vienna Jäger (300 in 2 companies)
Pioneers (340 in 2 companies)
Artillery
4 Artillery Batteries (each 6 guns)
2 (Russian) Artillery Batteries (each 10 guns)
(Russian) Heavy Battery Nr. 3 (12x 12-pdr)
Heavy Battery Nr. 1 (6x 12-pdr)
Heavy Battery Nr. 2 (6x 12-pdr)

Fifth (cavalry) column 
Strength: 5,375 horsemen, 24 light pieces. Feldmarschall-Leutnant Prince Johann von Liechtenstein with Feldmarschall-Leutnant Ludwig Prinz zu Hohenlohe-Bartenstein and Lieutenant-General Alexander Essen
1st Cavalry Brigade – General-Major Johann Karl Caramelli
Nassau Cuirassier Regiment Nr. 5 (300 in 6 sqns) – Colonel Friedrich von Minutillo
Lorraine Cuirassier Regiment Nr. 7 (300 in 6 sqns) – Colonel Clemens Freiherr von Thunefeld
2nd Cavalry Brigade – General-Major Johann Weber von Treuenfels
Kaiser Cuirassier Regiment Nr. 1 (500 in 8 sqns) – Colonel Wilhelm von Motzen
3rd Cavalry Brigade – Major-General Gladkov
Grand Duke Constantine Uhlan Regiment Nr. 3 – Major-General Meller-Zakomelski
Gordeev Cossack Regiment
Isayev Cossack Regiment
Denisov Cossack Regiment
4th Cavalry Brigade Lieutenant-General Adjutant F. P. Uvarov
Chernigov Dragoon Regiment (5 sqns)
Kharkov Dragoon Regiment  (5 sqns)
Elisabetgrad Hussar Regiment
(Russian) Horse-Artillery Battery Nr. 2 (12x 6-pdr)
(Russian) Horse-Artillery Battery Nr. 3 (12x 6-pdr)
Horse-Artillery Battery Nr. 3 (6x 6-pdr)

References
 Duffy, Christopher. Austerlitz 1805. Hamden, Conn.: Archon Books, 1977.
 Smith, Digby. The Napoleonic Wars Data Book. London: Greenhill, 1998. 
Austrian generals by Digby Smith, compiled by Leopold Kudrna

"Russian-Austrian Order-of-Battle at Austerlitz: 2 December 1805" by Stephen Millar

Napoleonic Wars orders of battle
Battles of the War of the Third Coalition
War of the Third Coalition
Battle of Austerlitz